Jimmy O'Connor is an Irish former footballer notable for being the fastest hat-trick scorer in top level domestic league history. He scored three goals for Shelbourne in 2 minutes and 13 seconds, versus Bohemians at Dalymount Park on 19 November 1967.	

O'Connor made 109 league appearances, scoring 26 goals, with Shels from 1965-66 to 1971-72.

His son Barry O'Connor also played in the League of Ireland scoring 107 goals in his career.

References

Year of birth missing (living people)
Republic of Ireland association footballers
Shelbourne F.C. players
League of Ireland players
Living people
Association footballers not categorized by position